Amina Tailors is a 1991 Indian Malayalam-language film, directed by Sajan and produced by Ramakrishnan. The film stars Ashokan, Rizabawa, Parvathy Jayaram and Rajan P. Dev in the lead roles. The film has musical score by Raghu Kumar.

Plot
The movie is about a tailor who falls love in with a beautiful girl, to which her father, an evil butcher objects to. The movie depicts the value of literacy and shows the ill effects of illiteracy existed in Northern Kerala in the early 1990s.

Cast 
Ashokan as A. Abdul Azeez
Parvathy as Amina Hydrose
Rajan P. Dev as Moori Hydrose
Rizabawa as Nazer
Jagadish as Manjeri Majeed
Mamukkoya as False Malappuram Moidheen
Shubha as Pathuma Hydrose
Innocent as Lonappan Master
Sankaradi as Nair
Kuthiravattam Pappu as Kunjalavi
Kunjandi as Real Malappuram Moidheen
Mala Aravindan as Jabbar
Mohan Raj as Bapputty
Paravoor Bharathan as Vasu
Philomina as Khadeejumma
Chemanchery Narayanan Nair

Soundtrack 
The music was composed by Raghu Kumar and the lyrics were written by Kaithapram.

References

External links 
 

1991 films
1990s Malayalam-language films
Films shot in Palakkad
Films shot in Kozhikode
Films shot in Kannur
Films scored by Raghu Kumar
Films directed by Sajan